Franklin Delano Edwards (born February 2, 1959) is an American former professional basketball player who was selected by the Philadelphia 76ers in the first round (22nd pick overall) of the 1981 NBA draft. A 6'1" point guard from Cleveland State University, Edwards played in 7 NBA seasons from 1981 to 1988. He played for the 76ers, Los Angeles Clippers and Sacramento Kings.

In his NBA career, Edwards played in 296 games and scored a total of 1,802 points. His best year as a professional came during the 1985–86 NBA season as a member of the Clippers, appearing in 73 games and averaging 9.0 ppg.

External links
NBA stats @ basketballreference.com

1959 births
Living people
American men's basketball players
Basketball players from New York City
Cleveland State Vikings men's basketball players
Julia Richman Education Complex alumni
Lancaster Lightning players
Los Angeles Clippers players
Philadelphia 76ers draft picks
Philadelphia 76ers players
Point guards
Sacramento Kings players